Mozammel Haque (1955/1956 – 12 January 2023) was a Bangladesh Nationalist Party politician and the former Member of Parliament of Natore-4.

Career
Haque was elected to parliament from Natore-4 as a Bangladesh Nationalist Party candidate in 2001. He received 111,626 votes while his nearest rival, Md. Abdul Quddus of the Awami League, received 79,450 votes. He was the president of Gurudaspur Upazila unit of Bangladesh Nationalist Party.

Haque contested the 2008 general election as a candidate of Bangladesh Nationalist Party but lost to Md. Abdul Quddus of the Awami League. Haque received 115,409 votes while Quddus received 160,549 votes.

Haque boycotted the 2014 election along with the rest of Bangladesh Nationalist Party and Md. Abdul Quddus was elected unopposed from Natore-4.

Haque was an alternate candidate of the Bangladesh Nationalist Party from Natore-4 in the 2018 general election. The nomination went to Abdul Aziz, chairman of Gurudaspur Upazila, who lost to Md. Abdul Quddus.

Death 
Haque died in Gurudaspur Municipality, Natore District on 12 January 2023, at the age of 67.

References

1950s births
Year of birth uncertain
2023 deaths
8th Jatiya Sangsad members
Bangladesh Nationalist Party politicians
People from Natore District